Emir Edilbekovich Shigaybayev (born 12 August 2001) is a Kyrgyzstani professional footballer who plays for Talant.

References

External links 
 
 
 Profile at Crimean Football Union

2001 births
Living people
Kyrgyzstani footballers
Kyrgyzstan youth international footballers
Association football midfielders
Kyrgyzstani expatriate footballers
Expatriate footballers in Turkey
Kyrgyzstani expatriate sportspeople in Turkey
Expatriate footballers in Belarus
Kyrgyzstani expatriate sportspeople in Belarus
Crimean Premier League players
FC Kara-Balta players
FC Neman Grodno players
FC Rubin Yalta players